The Truth Seekers (Chinese: 真探) is a Singaporean drama produced and telecast on Mediacorp Channel 8. The show aired at 9pm on weekdays and had a repeat telecast at 8am the following day. The series stars Chen Hanwei, Rebecca Lim, Desmond Tan and Yusuke Fukuchi who play a team of cold-case investigators who go over unsolved mysteries to uncover the truth. It consists of 23 episodes, and began its run from 28 April 2016.

Cast

Main 

 Chen Hanwei as Bai Qingxiong 白庆雄: A former CID team leader, Bai Qingxiong, formed a detective agency called the Cold Case Investigators (CCI) and also the team leader of the investigators.
 Rebecca Lim as Huang Yuyang 黄渝阳: A former CID team member, Hang, joined the CCI as an investigator.
 Isabel Yamada (山田熙) as young Huang Yuyang
 Desmond Tan as Hong Junyan 洪俊焱: A CCI investigator
 Ezekiel Chee (徐从义) as young Hong Junyan
 Yusuke Fukuchi 福地祐介 as Lan Haifeng 蓝海峰 : The IT Whiz of CCI, Lan is also a shareholder of the CCI and also member of the investigation team.

Supporting cast

Cameo appearance

Unsolved cases characters

Park Murder (公园裸尸案)

Familicide (灭门惨案)

Couple's Suicide Pact (殉情悬案)

Corpseless Kidnap (无尸撕票案)

Floating Partial Body (半截浮尸案)

Jewellery Robbery (金庄抢劫案)

Missing Children (失踪奇案)

Sudden Mysterious Death (神秘猝死案)

Original Soundtrack

Accolades
The Truth Seekers was nominated for the Best Screenplay in the 2017 Star Awards and won the award.

See also
 List of MediaCorp Channel 8 Chinese drama series (2010s)
 List of The Truth Seekers episodes

References

2016 Singaporean television series debuts
2016 Singaporean television series endings
Channel 8 (Singapore) original programming
Singapore Chinese dramas